Andrew George Hinchcliffe (born 5 February 1969) is an English former professional footballer, sports television pundit and co-commentator for Sky Sports.

As a player, he was a left-back from 1986 until 2002. He began his career with Manchester City in the old First Division but later played in the Premier League of both Everton and Sheffield Wednesday. He was part of the Everton side that lifted the FA Cup in 1995. He was also capped seven times by England between 1996 and 1998 having initially won a single cap for the England U21 team.

Since his retirement he has worked largely in the media sector as a pundit and co-commentator usually on Sky Sports coverage of the Premier League and the Championship.

Playing career
For much of his early life, Hinchcliffe played for Manchester City's academy, coming through with a number of other players who would go on to establish themselves for City's senior side. In 1986 he was part of the side which won the club's first ever FA Youth Cup trophy, playing in a team which also featured Ian Brightwell, Steve Redmond, David White, Paul Lake and Paul Moulden, and which was managed by club legend Tony Book.

Having started his career with City he established himself as the club's first choice left back. Whilst at City, Hinchcliffe was one of the scorers in the Manchester derby on 23 September 1989 in a 5–1 victory over Manchester United. Hinchcliffe won the 1995 FA Cup while with Everton and enjoyed the best form of his career at the club, winning seven full England caps. His England debut came in a 3–0 away victory over Moldova on 1 September 1996, in what was manager Glenn Hoddle's first game in charge.

After injuring his cruciate ligament in December 1996, Hinchcliffe did not return until September 1997, with Everton then under new management after Howard Kendall had replaced Joe Royle. Kendall was not known to be a big Hinchliffe fan, having sold him previously whilst Manchester City manager. He was subsequently sold by the Toffees to Sheffield Wednesday five months into Kendall's reign for £2.65m where he played for a further four years.

Hinchcliffe retired from playing football in March 2002 following a surgery on his left knee. He only made two appearances in his final season at the club (2001–02), one of which was in the League Cup semifinal first leg against Blackburn Rovers, the other in the league against Crewe Alexandra.

Media career
Hinchcliffe now works as a co-commentator on Sky Sports. He does co-commentary for both Premier League and Championship games, as well as some Manchester City games in the Women's Super League. He also sometimes appears on Sky Sports News in the morning with other football guests to talk about transfers and games that have gone on recently.

Personal life
Hinchcliffe was educated at Manchester's William Hulme's Grammar School for Boys, a rugby-playing school.

Like his Everton teammate, Duncan Ferguson, Hinchcliffe has inspired a composition by the Finnish composer Osmo Tapio Räihälä, who wrote an orchestral work titled Hinchcliffe Thumper - Tha' Bloody Intermezzo in 1993. The work was premiered in Malmö, Sweden in 1994.

Honours

Manchester City
FA Youth Cup: 1985-86

Everton
 FA Cup: 1994–95
 FA Charity Shield: 1995

Individual
PFA Team of the Year: 1987–88 Second Division

References

External links

English footballers
England international footballers
England under-21 international footballers
Association football defenders
Manchester City F.C. players
Everton F.C. players
Sheffield Wednesday F.C. players
Premier League players
Footballers from Manchester
1969 births
Living people
People educated at William Hulme's Grammar School
English association football commentators
FA Cup Final players